Bloodland Lake virus (BLLV) is a single-stranded, negative-sense RNA virus of New World Orthohantavirus first isolated in a Prairie vole (Microtus ochrogaster) near Bloodland Lake, Fort Leonard Wood, Pulaski County, Missouri in 1994. BLLV has also been isolated in Prairie voles in St. Louis County, Missouri.

Natural reservoir 
BLLV is unique to the Prairie vole. At the time of its discovery in Pulaski County in 1994, rats and mice trapped along with the Prairie vole tested negative for the virus but did test positive for other hantaviruses.

Transmission 
Transmission is via either direct contact with rodent excreta, or through droplet respiration due to aerosolization of rodent urine, saliva and/or feces. Transmission of hantavirus to humans from arvicoline species in North America has not been documented. To date, the only known transmissions of hantaviruses to humans have come from rats, bats, and mice.

See also 
 1993 Four Corners hantavirus outbreak

References

External links 
 "Hantaviruses, with emphasis on Four Corners Hantavirus" by Brian Hjelle, M.D., Department of Pathology, School of Medicine, University of New Mexico
 CDC's Hantavirus Technical Information Index page
 Viralzone: Hantavirus
 Virus Pathogen Database and Analysis Resource (ViPR): Hantaviridae
 Occurrences and deaths in North and South America

Hantaviridae
Zoonoses
Infraspecific virus taxa